Byrd in Flight is an album by American trumpeter Donald Byrd recorded in 1960 and released on the Blue Note label as BLP 4048 and BST 84048 featuring Byrd with Jackie McLean or Hank Mobley, Duke Pearson, Doug Watkins or Reggie Workman, and Lex Humphries.

Reception
The Allmusic review by Michael G. Nastos awarded the album 4 stars and stated "By the time of this fourth Blue Note album by trumpeter Donald Byrd, it became clear that his playing was becoming stronger with the passing of time".

Track listing
All compositions by Donald Byrd except as indicated

 "Ghana" - 7:20
 "Little Girl Blue" (Richard Rodgers, Lorenz Hart) - 7:28 mistitled Little Boy Blue
 "Gate City" (Duke Pearson) - 5:04
 "Lex" - 7:37
 "Bo" (Pearson) - 6:34
 "My Girl Shirl" (Pearson) - 5:48

Bonus tracks on CD reissue:
"Child's Play" (Byrd, Pearson) - 6:56
 "Carol" - 5:42
 "Soulful Kiddy" - 5:37

Personnel
Donald Byrd - trumpet
Jackie McLean - alto saxophone (tracks 5-6)
Hank Mobley - tenor saxophone (tracks 1, 3, 4 & 7-9)
Duke Pearson - piano
Doug Watkins (tracks 1, 3, 4 & 7-9), Reggie Workman (tracks 2, 5-6) - bass
Lex Humphries - drums

References

1960 albums
Albums produced by Alfred Lion
Albums recorded at Van Gelder Studio
Blue Note Records albums
Donald Byrd albums